Endenicher Bach  ("stream of Endenich") is a river of North Rhine-Westphalia, Germany.

The Endenicher Bach  is called Katzenlochbach at its origin but goes through some name changes on its way to a confluence with the Hardtbach (commonly known as the Dransdorfer Bach), which later flows into the river Rhine. It first changes into Endenicher Bach and later into Lengsdorfer Bach.

See also
List of rivers of North Rhine-Westphalia

References

Rivers of North Rhine-Westphalia
Tributaries of the Hardtbach (Rhine)
Rivers of Germany